The Waimea River is a river in Honolulu County on the island of Oahu in the U.S. state of Hawaii. It is formed by the confluence of the Kamananui stream and the Kaiwikoele stream northeast of Haleiwa and flows northwest through the Waimea Valley to the Pacific Ocean at Waimea Bay. The name Waimea translates to "red water."

The mouth of the river has become famous for its waves that are created when residents dredge the beach, creating a channel that allows the watercourse to drain when it is cut off by the beach.

See also
List of rivers of Hawaii

References 

Rivers of Hawaii